The Last Novel is a novel by David Markson.  Following in the tradition of his earlier work such as Wittgenstein's Mistress, Reader's Block, Vanishing Point, and This Is Not a Novel the novel is largely composed of obscure anecdotes about authors, artists, theorists, etc. The story of an ageing author, who may or may not be writing his last novel, slowly emerges through the fragments.

References

2007 American novels
Novels about writers
Counterpoint (publisher) books